Kim Gi-Dong (born 12 January 1972 in Dangjin) is a former South Korean footballer.

In 1991, Kim debuted as a professional player with Pohang Steelers (then POSCO Atoms) right after his graduation from high school, which was quite unusual then. (Choi Moon-Sik would be a similar case.) He started to appear in the top team matches after joining Yukong Elephants (Bucheon SK after 1996). Bucheon at that time was highly recognized to have a strong midfield under manager Valeri Nepomniachi, and he was a key member.

Kim returned to Pohang in 2003 and led the Steelers to the championship in 2007. He was also selected as the 'best eleven' of the league in 2007. He now holds 2nd place in career domestic appearance (league and cups) in K-League, only after goalkeeper Kim Byung-Ji.

On July 9, 2011, he became the oldest ever score in the K-League with his goal in the 7–0 victory over Daejeon Citizen.

Club career statistics

Honours

Player

Club
Yukong Elephants / Bucheon SK
League Cup (3) : 1994, 1996, 2000

Pohang Steelers
K League 1 (2) : 1992, 2007
League Cup (1) : 2009
AFC Champions League (1) : 2009

Individual
K League 1 Best XI : 2007

Manager

Individual
K League 1 Manager of the Year : 2020

References

External links
 
 National Team Player Record 
 
 

1972 births
Living people
People from Dangjin
Association football midfielders
South Korean footballers
Pohang Steelers players
Jeju United FC players
K League 1 players
South Korea international footballers
Sportspeople from South Chungcheong Province